Madhabpur  is a village in Chanditala II community development block of Srirampore subdivision in Hooghly district in the Indian state of West Bengal.

Geography
Chanditala police station serves this Village.

Gram panchayat
Villages and census towns in Baksa gram panchayat are: Baksa, Duttapur, Khoragari and Madhabpur.

Demographics
As per 2011 Census of India, Madhabpur had a total population of 3,982 of which 2,009 (50%) were males and 1,973 (50%) were females. Population below 6 years was 403. The total number of literates in Madhabpur was 2,880 (80.47% of the population over 6 years).

Notable people
 

Gokulanada Gitiswami (1896–1962), poet, writer and social reformer

Transport
The nearest railway stations, Begampur railway station and Janai Road railway station, are on the Howrah-Bardhaman chord line, which is a part of the Kolkata Suburban Railway system.

References 

Villages in Chanditala II CD Block